Ebagoola is a town in the Shire of Cook, Queensland, Australia. The town is within the locality of Yarraden.

Ebagoola Township and Battery

The town was surveyed in 1900 by James Dickie.

Ebagoola is the site of the Ebagoola Township and Battery, a former mining camp built from 1900 until 1913, which was added to the Queensland Heritage Register on 15 May 2006.

Ebagoolah Provisional School opened in 1905. On 1 January 1909 it became Ebagoolah State School.  It closed in 1914.

Today, only a single building from the era still stands.

References

Shire of Cook
Localities in Queensland